Shah Faisal Khan is a Pakistani politician who had been a member of the Provincial Assembly of Khyber Pakhtunkhwa, from September 2013 to May 2018 and from August 2018 to January 2023.

Education
He received a degree  in Bachelors of Arts  in 2002.

Political career

He was elected to the Provincial Assembly of Khyber Pakhtunkhwa as an independent candidate from Constituency PK-42 Hangu-I in by-polls held in August 2013. He received 38,391 votes and defeated an independent candidate, Syed Hussain.

In September 2013, he joined Pakistan Tehreek-e-Insaf (PTI).

He was re-elected to Provincial Assembly of Khyber Pakhtunkhwa as a candidate of PTI from Constituency PK-83 (Hangu-I) in 2018 Pakistani general election.

References

Living people
Khyber Pakhtunkhwa MPAs 2013–2018
Pakistan Tehreek-e-Insaf MPAs (Khyber Pakhtunkhwa)
Khyber Pakhtunkhwa MPAs 2018–2023
Year of birth missing (living people)